Ahmed Ibrahim Awale is a Somali environmentalist, botanist and author.

Awale was born in the village of Adadlay, 95km east of Hargeisa, and lived close to the mountain Gaan Libah. He was educated at the Somali National University.

He is president of the Somaliland Biodiversity Foundation and chair of the Somaliland organisation "Candlelight", which works in the fields of the environment, education and health. He is affiliated with the University of Hargeisa, and has written books in English on the archaeology and natural history of Somaliland, as well as works in Somali.

He is also known for his discovery of a new species of Aloe, the Somali Red Aloe ('Aloe sanguinalis') which he found growing wild near Alala Adka in 2014. The botanical author abbreviation Awale refers to him.

In 2020 a species of scorpion, Pandinurus awalei, was named in his honour.

Works

References

External links 

 
  - Awale's TEDx talk, given in Hargeisa

Living people
1954 births
Somaliland people
African environmentalists
Botanists active in Africa
Somalian non-fiction writers
Somali National University alumni
Date of birth missing (living people)